Prague 3 (formally the Prague 3 Municipal District), is a second-tier municipality in Prague. It is geographically identical to the national administrative district (správní obvod) and city administrative district (městský obvod) of the same name.

The district includes most of the cadastral area of Žižkov and parts of Vinohrady, Vysočany and Strašnice. The district area has remained intact since its creation in 1960.

Like many districts of the city, Prague 3 is socioeconomically diverse. The western part of Žižkov is known for its high concentration of brothels, strip clubs and cheap bars. Yet only a short distance away are nice apartments and a new shopping mall with expensive stores.

Two of Prague's most-visible landmarks are in Prague 3: the National Monument on the Vítkov hill, with its giant equestrian statue of Jan Žižka; and the 216 metre-high Žižkov Tower, Prague's tallest structure. The large Olšany Cemetery take up much of the district. A New Jewish Cemetery nearby, one of two historic Jewish burial places in the district, contains the grave of Bohemian-German writer Franz Kafka.

See also
Districts of Prague#Symbols

References

External links
 Prague 3 official site
 Prague 3 flag and coat of arms from Flags of the World
 Census statistics for Czech municipalities (in Czech)

 
Districts of Prague